During the 2007–08 season, Betis finished 13th in the La Liga.

Squad

Competitions

La Liga

League table

Copa del Rey

References

Real Betis seasons
Real Betis